Ian Wakenshaw (born ) is an English wheelchair curler.

Teams

References

External links 

Living people
1950 births
English male curlers
English wheelchair curlers
Place of birth missing (living people)